North Zulch High School is a 2A public high school located in unincorporated North Zulch, Texas (USA). It is part of the North Zulch Independent School District located in west central Madison County. In 2011, the school was rated "Academically Acceptable" by the Texas Education Agency.

References

External links
 http://www.nzisd.org

Public high schools in Texas
Public middle schools in Texas
Education in Madison County, Texas